Rubroboletus satanas, commonly known as Satan's bolete or the Devil's bolete, is a basidiomycete fungus of the bolete family (Boletaceae) and one of its most infamous members. It was known as Boletus satanas before its transfer to the new genus Rubroboletus in 2014, based on molecular phylogenetic data. Found in broad-leaved and mixed woodland in the warmer regions of Europe, it is classified as a poisonous mushroom, known to cause gastrointestinal symptoms of diarrhea and violent vomiting. However, reports of poisoning are rare, due to its striking appearance and at times putrid smell, which discourage casual experimentation.

The flesh turns blue when cut or bruised, and overripe fruit bodies often emit an unpleasant smell reminiscent of carrion. It is arguably the largest bolete found in Europe.

Taxonomy and phylogeny
Originally known as Boletus satanas, the Satan's bolete was described by German mycologist Harald Othmar Lenz in 1831. Lenz was aware of several reports of adverse reactions from people who had consumed this fungus and apparently felt himself ill from its "emanations" while describing it, hence giving it its sinister epithet. The Greek word  (satanas, meaning Satan), is derived from the Hebrew śāṭān (שטן). American mycologist Harry D. Thiers concluded that material from North America matches the species description, however, genetic testing has since confirmed that western North American collections represent Rubroboletus eastwoodiae, a different species.

Genetic analysis published in 2013 revealed that B. satanas and several other red-pored boletes, are part of the "/dupainii" clade (named after B. dupainii), and are distantly nested from the core group of Boletus (including B. edulis and relatives) within the Boletineae. This indicated that B. satanas and its relatives belonged to a distinct genus. The species was hence transferred to the new genus Rubroboletus in 2014, along with several allied red-pored, blue-staining bolete species. Genetic testing on several species of the genus revealed that R. satanas is most closely related to R. pulchrotinctus, a morphologically similar but much rarer species occurring in the Mediterranean regions

Common names
Both Rubroboletus satanas and Suillellus luridus are known as ayimantari ('bear mushroom') in eastern Turkey.

Description
The compact cap can reach an impressive , extraordinarily , very rarely  in diameter. At first it is hemispherical with an inrolled margin, but becomes convex at maturity as the fruit body expands, while in older specimens the margin might be slightly undulating. When young, the pileus is greyish white to silvery-white or buff, but older specimens tend to develop olivaceous, ochraceous or brownish tinges. The surface of the cap is finely tomentose, becoming smooth at maturity and is often slightly viscid in wet weather. The cuticle is tightly attached to the flesh and does not peel.

The pores (tube mouths) are rounded, yellow to orange at first, but soon turning red from the point of their attachment to the stem outwards, eventually becoming entirely purplish red or carmine-red at full maturity and instantly bluing when touched or bruised. Its colour is golden-yellow to orange at the apex, becoming increasingly pinkish-red to reddish-orange further down and deep carmine-red to purple-red towards the base. It is decorated in a fine, yellowish to reddish hexagonal net, sometimes confined to the upper half of the stipe. The flesh is thick, spongy and whitish, but may be yellow to straw-coloured in immature specimens and is sometimes reddish at the stem base. It slowly turns a faded blue colour when cut, bluing more intensely around the apex and above the tubes. The smell is weak and pleasantly musky in young fruit bodies, but becomes increasingly putrid in older specimens, reminiscent of carrion. Young specimens have a reportedly pleasant, nutty taste. The spore print is olivaceous green.

The spores are fusiform (spindle-shaped) when viewed under a microscope and measure 10–16 × 4.5–7.5 μm. The cap cuticle is composed of interwoven septate hyphae, which are often finely incrusted.

Similar species
Satan's bolete can be confused with a number of other species:

Rubroboletus rhodoxanthus is found predominantly on acidic soil, develops pinkish tinges of the cap, has a more or less cylindrical or clavate stipe with a very dense, well-developed net and lemon-yellow flesh that distinctly stains blue only in the cap when longitudinally sliced.
Rubroboletus legaliae is also acidophilous, has pinkish tinges on the cap, flesh that stains more extensively blue when cut and narrower spores, measuring 9–15 × 4–6 μm.
Rubroboletus pulchrotinctus has a variable cap colour often featuring a pinkish band at the margin; has a dull-coloured stipe without deep red tinges, pores that remain yellow or orange even in mature fruit bodies, and somewhat narrower spores, measuring 12–15 × 4.5–6 μm.
Rubroboletus rubrosanguineus is associated with spruce (Picea) or fir (Abies), has pinkish tinges on the cap and smaller spores, measuring 10–14.5 × 4–6 μm.
Caloboletus calopus is usually associated with coniferous trees, has pores that remain persistently yellow even in overripe fruit bodies, has a more slender, cylindrical or clavate stipe and narrower spores, measuring 11–16 × 4–5.5 μm.

Distribution and habitat
Rubroboletus satanas is widely distributed throughout the temperate zone, but is rare in most of its reported localities. In Europe, it mostly occurs in the southern regions and is rare or absent in northern countries. It fruits in the summer and early autumn in warm, broad-leaved and mixed forests, forming ectomycorrhizal associations with oak (Quercus) and sweet chestnut (Castanea), with a preference for calcareous (chalky) soils. Other frequently reported hosts are  hornbeam (Carpinus), beech (Fagus) and lime (Tilia).

In the United Kingdom, this striking bolete is found only in the south of England. It is rare in Scandinavia, occurring primarily on a few islands in the Baltic Sea where conditions are favourable, with highly calcareous soil. In the eastern Mediterranean region, it has been reported from the Bar'am Forest in the Upper Galilee region of northern Israel, as well as the island of Cyprus, where it is found in association with the narrow-endemic golden oak (Quercus alnifolia). It has further been documented in the Black Sea and eastern Anatolia regions of Turkey, as well as Crimea and Ukraine, with its distribution possibly extending as far south as Iran.

In the past, R. satanas had been reported from the coastal areas of California and the southeastern US, however, these sightings are instead of the closely related species Rubroboletus eastwoodiae.

Toxicity

Satan's bolete is poisonous, especially if eaten raw. The symptoms, which are predominantly gastrointestinal in nature, include nausea, abdominal pain, violent vomiting and bloody diarrhea that can last up to six hours. A 2012 study on mushroom poisonings in Switzerland by Katharina M. Schenk-Jaeger and colleagues, found Rubroboletus satanas to have caused severe gastrointestinal symptoms, including recurrent vomiting and bloody diarrhea.

The toxic enzyme bolesatine has been isolated from fruiting bodies of R. satanas and implicated in the poisonings. Bolesatine is a protein synthesis inhibitor and, when given to mice, causes massive thrombosis. At lower concentrations, bolesatine is a mitogen, inducing cell division in human T lymphocytes. Muscarine has also been isolated from the fungus, but the quantities are believed to be far too small to account for its toxic effects. More recent studies have associated the poisoning caused by R. satanas with hyperprocalcitonemia, and classified it as a distinct syndrome among fungal poisonings.

Controversially, English mycologist John Ramsbottom reported in 1953 that R. satanas is consumed in certain parts of Italy and the former Czechoslovakia. In those regions, the fungus is reportedly eaten following prolonged boiling that may neutralise the toxins, though this has never been proven scientifically. Similar reports exist from the San Francisco Bay Area of the United States, but probably involve a different fungus misidentified as R. satanas. Ramsbottom speculated that there may be a regional variation in its toxicity, and conceded that the fungus may not be as poisonous as widely reported. Nevertheless, R. satanas is rarely sampled casually, not least because of the putrid smell of its mature fruiting bodies, which in addition to their bright colours and blue staining, make the fungus unappealing for human consumption.

References

Poisonous fungi
satanas
Fungi of Europe
Fungi described in 1831